Yuxarı Kəbirli (known as Səhra until 1994) is a village and municipality in the Beylagan Rayon of Azerbaijan. It has a population of 860.

References

Populated places in Beylagan District